Eurymyrmex is an extinct genus of ant in the Formicidae subfamily Dolichoderinae. The genus contains a single described species Eurymyrmex geologicus. It was described in 1994, where the first fossils of the ant were found in China.

References

†
Monotypic fossil ant genera
Fossil taxa described in 1994
Insects of China